Sunset Stadium is a multi-use stadium in Lusaka, Zambia.  It is currently used mostly for football matches and serves as the home for Zanaco FC. The stadium holds about 5,100 people.

Football venues in Zambia
Buildings and structures in Lusaka
Sport in Lusaka